Dylan File (born June 4, 1996) is an American professional baseball pitcher for the Doosan Bears of the KBO League.

Amateur career
File attended Desert Hills High School in St. George, Utah, where he played baseball. In 2014, his senior year, he went 7–2 with a 0.63 ERA along with batting .400. Unselected in the 2015 Major League Baseball draft, he enrolled at Dixie State University where he played college baseball.

In 2015, File's freshman season at Dixie State, he appeared in 12 games (ten starts) in which he went 6–1 with a 2.63 ERA, striking out 44 over  innings. He was named the Pacific West Conference Freshman of the Year. As a sophomore in 2016, he started 14 games, going 6–1 with a 2.99 ERA. That summer, he played in the Northwoods League with the Wisconsin Rapids Rafters. In 2017, his junior year, File went 8–2 with a 3.58 ERA over 15 games (14 starts), striking out 75 over 93 innings, earning Pacific West Co-Pitcher of the Year. Following the season, he was selected by the Milwaukee Brewers in the 21st round of the 2017 Major League Baseball draft.

Professional career

Milwaukee Brewers
File signed with Milwaukee and made his professional debut with the Helena Brewers. Over 12 games (seven starts), he went 1–2 with a 4.02 ERA. In 2018, he spent the season with the Wisconsin Timber Rattlers, with whom he was named a Midwest League All-Star, and compiled an 8–10 record with a 3.96 ERA, striking out 114 over  innings and 25 starts. In 2019, he began the year with the Carolina Mudcats (earning Carolina League All-Star honors) before being promoted to the Biloxi Shuckers in June, with whom he finished the year. Over 26 starts between both teams, File pitched to a 15–6 record with a 3.24 ERA, collecting 136 strikeouts over 147 innings.

File did not play a minor league game in 2020 due to the cancellation of the minor league season caused by the COVID-19 pandemic. The Brewers added him to their 40-man roster after the season. In February 2021, File underwent surgery to repair a stress fracture in his right elbow, forcing him to miss the beginning of the 2021 season. He was placed on the 60-day injured list on May 2. He was activated in early July and was assigned to the Nashville Sounds of the Triple-A East. Over 13 starts, File went 2–5 with a 5.36 ERA and 45 strikeouts over  innings. He was assigned back to Nashville to begin the 2022 season. He was outrighted off the 40-man roster on May 23, 2022. File was released after the season.

Doosan Bears
On November 16, 2022, File signed a contract with the Doosan Bears of the KBO.

References

External links

Minor league baseball players
1996 births
Living people
Baseball pitchers
Baseball players from Utah
Utah Tech Trailblazers baseball players
Helena Brewers players
Wisconsin Timber Rattlers players
Carolina Mudcats players
Nashville Sounds players